The 1919 Tour de France was the 13th edition of the Tour de France, taking place from 29 June to 27 July over a total distance of . It was the first Tour de France after World War I, and was won by Firmin Lambot. Following the tenth stage, the yellow jersey, given to the leader of the general classification, was introduced, and first worn by Eugène Christophe.

The fighting in World War I had ravaged the French road system, which made cycling difficult. As a result, the average speed (24.056 km/h) and the number of finishing cyclists (ten) were the lowest in history.

Background
Since the previous Tour de France in 1914, it was impossible to organise the Tour de France due to World War I. Tour organiser Henri Desgrange always wanted to organise a new Tour after the war, and within days after the end of the war, the organisation of the 1919 Tour de France started.

Innovations and changes
Three former winners of the Tour, François Faber, Octave Lapize and Lucien Petit-Breton had died fighting in the war. Two other former winners, Philippe Thys and Odile Defraye started the race. The war had been only over for seven months, so most cyclists did not have a chance to train enough for the Tour. For that reason, there were almost no new younger cyclists, and the older cyclists dominated the race. The organisation did not make it easy for the cyclists: with the addition of a stop at Strasbourg (recently recovered in the war), the length was extended to 5560 km; it was longer than all the previous Tours, and since then only the 1926 Tour de France has been longer.

The bicycle manufacturers had also suffered from the war and were unable to sponsor teams of cyclists. They worked together and sponsored more than half of the cyclists under the name "La Sportive", but effectively all the cyclists rode as individuals, wearing grey jerseys. The lack of team colours made riders indistinguishable and lead to the introduction of the leader's jersey. Cyclists were divided in an A-category (professional) and a B-category (amateurs).

In previous years, cyclists had to take care of their own food during the race. In 1919, the tour organisation took care of this.

Participants

Race overview

The first stage was won by Belgian Jean Rossius. However, he was penalised with 30 minutes for illegally helping Philippe Thys (handing him a water bottle), therefore Henri Pélissier was leading the race. It had not helped Thys however, because he had to abandon the race in the first stage after a large crash.

In the beginning of the race, Henri and Francis Pélissier were the best. They both finished before the rest in stage two, with Henri crossing the line first. In the third stage, Henri, leading the race, wanted to stop. Organizer Desgrange did all he could to change Pélissier's mind, and finally Pélissier started to race again. He was already 45 minutes behind, and the next three hours he was chasing the rest. He finally caught up, and finished second in the sprint, after his brother Francis. After that victory, Henri Pélissier said that he was a thoroughbred and the rest of the cyclists were work horses, which made the other cyclists angry. During that third stage, Léon Scieur punctured four times, and lost two hours.

In the fourth stage, the rest of the cyclists (only 25 were still in race) took revenge on the Pélissier brothers. When they had to change bicycles, everybody else sped away from them. Henri Pélissier chased the rest, but was then ordered by Desgrange to stop working together with other cyclists in his pursuit. In the end, Henri Pélissier had lost more than 35 minutes, and his brother Francis over three hours. The Pélissier brothers were angry at the organisation and left the race. Jean Alavoine won the stage, and Eugène Christophe became the new leader in the general classification.

Christophe was still in Grenoble at the start of stage eleven, when, at 2am tour organiser Henri Desgrange gave him a yellow jersey, so that he could easily be recognized.  The colour was inspired by the colour of the organizing newspaper l'Auto, although another explanation is that other colours were not available in the post-war shortage. Previously the leader would wear a green armband. Christophe was not happy with his yellow jersey, and other cyclists called him a canary. At that point in the race, it was likely that Christophe would stay the leader until the end of the Tour de France, because he remained in that yellow jersey after the Pyrenees and the Alps. In the penultimate stage, Firmin Lambot, who was in second position, more than 28 minutes behind, attacked. Christophe, still leading the race, chased him, but broke his fork close to Valenciennes. The rules were such that cyclists could get no help at all, so Christophe repaired his bicycle himself. This same thing had already cost him the victory in 1913, and would happen to him for a third time in 1922. It took him over two and a half hours, and he had lost the lead to Lambot. In the last stage, Christophe had a record number of punctures, and also lost his second place to Jean Alavoine.
Lambot, aged 33, was at that moment the oldest Tour de France winner in history.

Because the organising newspaper l'Auto felt bad for Christophe, he received the same prize money as the winner Lambot. In addition, a collection raised money, the donors for this prize were reported in 20 pages in the newspaper. Altogether, Christophe received 13310 Francs, much more than the 5000 Francs that Lambot received for his victory.

Results

In each stage, all cyclists started together. The cyclist who reached the finish first, was the winner of the stage.
The time that each cyclist required to finish the stage was recorded. For the general classification, these times were added up; the cyclist with the least accumulated time was the race leader. From the eleventh stage on, the leader in the general classification was identified by the yellow jersey.

Stage winners

General classification

Of the 67 cyclists that started the race, only 11 cyclists finished. On 12 August 1919, Paul Duboc (8th overall), was disqualified for borrowing a car to go and repair his pedal axle, which left only 10 cyclists in the final classification.
In total, 43 cyclists started as category A, and 24 cyclists as category B.

Aftermath
The yellow jersey that was introduced in this tour, was so successful that it has been used ever since. Thys claimed to have worn the first yellow jersey when leading in 1913: Desgrange had requested him to wear a distinguishable coloured jersey, so his team manager found him a yellow jersey. The winner of the race, Lambot, would later also win the 1922 Tour de France, but has become a half-forgotten figure in the Tour's history. Christophe, who lost the Tour due to bad luck, is still remembered as an eternal second.

The fight between cyclist Pélissier and tour organiser Desgrange would continue for many years. Pélissier would win the 1923 Tour de France.

Notes

References

Bibliography

Further reading

External links

 
Tour de France
Tour de France by year
Tour De France, 1919
Tour de France
Tour de France